Hippurarctia ferrigera is a moth of the family Erebidae. It was described by Herbert Druce in 1910. It is found in Cameroon, the Democratic Republic of the Congo, Kenya and Uganda.

References

Syntomini
Moths described in 1910
Moths of Africa